Into the Pit may refer to:

 Into the Pit (Ultimatum album), 2007
 Into the Pit (Fight album), 2008
 "Into the Pit", a song by Testament from the album The New Order
 "Into the Pit", a song by Fight from the album War of Words